Yemen, officially the Republic of Yemen (1990–present), is a country at the southern end of the Arabian Peninsula.

Yemen may also refer to:
North Yemen
Mutawakkilite Kingdom of Yemen (1918–1961)
Yemen Arab Republic (1962–1990)
South Yemen
Aden Protectorate (1917–1963)
Aden Colony (1937–1963)
Federation of the Emirates of the South (1959–1963)
Protectorate of South Arabia (1963–1967)
Federation of South Arabia (1963–1967)
People's Republic of South Yemen (1967–1970)
People's Democratic Republic of Yemen (1970–1990)
Greater Yemen
Upper Yemen
Lower Yemen

See also
Yaman (disambiguation)
Yemenite (disambiguation)
Yamen